The Deputy Prime Minister of Yugoslavia was the official Deputy of the Prime Minister of the Kingdom of Yugoslavia, SFR Yugoslavia and later Prime Minister of FR Yugoslavia, from 1939 until 2003.

History of the office
The office of the Deputy Prime Minister of the Kingdom of Yugoslavia was established on 26 August 1939, during the government of Dragiša Cvetković. It was initially held by Vladko Maček.

The office of the Deputy Prime Minister of SFR Yugoslavia was established on 2 February 1946, during the government of Josip Broz Tito. It was initially held by two people: Edvard Kardelj and Jaša Prodanović. From then on, the office was usually held simultaneously by several people at the same time. Also, Deputy Prime Ministers sometimes combined the post with another government portfolio.

The office of the Deputy Prime Minister of FR Yugoslavia was abolished with the constitutional reforms of 2003. Therefore, the last Deputy Prime Minister was Miroljub Labus, who served from 4 November 2000 to 17 March 2003.

List of deputy prime ministers

Kingdom of Yugoslavia period (1939–1945)

SFR Yugoslavia period (1945–1992)

See also
Prime Minister of Yugoslavia

Government of Yugoslavia
Yugoslavia
Deputy Prime ministers
1946 establishments in Yugoslavia